Dry Bones Dance is an album by Mark Heard, released in 1990, the first to be released on his own Fingerprint Records. The album was listed at No. 29 in CCM Presents: The 100 Greatest Albums in Christian Music.

Track listing 

All songs written by Mark Heard. 
 "Rise From The Ruins" – 3:03
 "The Dry Bones Dance" – 3:48
 "House of Broken Dreams" – 4:13
 "Our Restless Hearts" – 3:43
 "Nobody's Looking"  – 3:26
 "All She Wanted Was Love" – 4:20
 "Strong Hand of Love"  – 3:05
 "How Many Tears"  – 3:01
 "Lonely Road"  – 4:12
 "Waiting for a Reason" – 3:31
 "Everything Is Alright" – 4:24
 "Awake in the Night Time" – 3:30
 "Mercy of the Flame" – 4:24
 "Fire" – 7:13

Personnel 
 Mark Heard – acoustic and electric guitar, vocals, accordion, harmonica, kalimba, assorted background vocals
 David Birmingham – drums
 Fergus Marsh – chapman stick
 Byron Berline – fiddle, mandolin
 Michael Been – guitar solo on "Lonely Road" 
 Novi – viola
 Doug Berch – hammered dulcimer
 Sam Phillips – vocals (3, 4, 5, 12)
 Pam Dwinell – vocals (1, 2, 7, 9)
 Jerry Chamberlain and Sharon McCall – vocals (11, 13, 14)

Production notes
 Mark Heard – producer, engineer, mixing at Fingerprint Recorders
 Dan Russell – associate producer
 Chuck Long – executive-at-large
 Joel Russell – wagonmaster
 Joel Russell – second engineer
 Richard Tiegen – second engineer
 Dan Reed – second engineer
 David Miner – second engineer
 Tom Willett – second engineer, occasional back-seat driving
 Plum Studios, Newburyport, Massachusetts – basic track recording studio

References

1990 albums
Mark Heard albums